The Second Battle of Marengo or Battle of Cascina Grossa (20 June 1799) saw French troops under General of Division Jean Victor Marie Moreau clash with a force of Austrian soldiers led by Feldmarschall-Leutnant Heinrich von Bellegarde. The early fighting between Emmanuel Grouchy's division and Bellegarde was inconclusive. However, late in the day Moreau committed Paul Grenier's French division to the struggle and the Austrians were driven from the field. This War of the Second Coalition battle occurred near Spinetta Marengo which is just east of Alessandria, Italy.  

Moreau was supposed to cooperate with Jacques MacDonald's army which was grappling with Alexander Suvorov's Austro-Russians at the Battle of Trebbia to the east. When Moreau moved north, Bellegarde offered battle because his task was to keep the French from joining MacDonald. Moreau was too late; that day MacDonald's defeated army began to retreat from the Trebbia River. The French victory was barren because Moreau soon had to withdraw to the mountains to avoid being caught by Suvorov's returning soldiers.

References

Conflicts in 1799
Battles of the French Revolutionary Wars
Battles of the War of the Second Coalition
Battles involving France
Battles involving Austria
1799 in Italy